Anjos do Sol (English: Angels of the Sun) is a 2006 Brazilian film directed by Rudi Lagemann. The film had its world premiere at the Miami International Film Festival, winning the Audience Awards. Anjos do Sol won Best Picture Award at 34º Gramado Film Festival.

Cast 
Antônio Calloni ...Saraiva
Chico Diaz ...Tadeu
Darlene Glória ...Vera
Otávio Augusto ...Lourenço
Vera Holtz ...Nazaré
Fernanda Carvalho ...Maria
Bianca Comparato ...Inês
Caco Monteiro ...Tonho
Mary Sheyla ...Celeste

References

External links 
Anjos do Sol on IMDb

2006 films
Brazilian drama films
2006 drama films
2000s Portuguese-language films